Fabio Infimo (born 18 July 1988) is an Italian rower. He competed in the men's eight event at the 2016 Summer Olympics.

References

External links
 

1988 births
Living people
Italian male rowers
Olympic rowers of Italy
Rowers at the 2016 Summer Olympics
Place of birth missing (living people)